The Settebello was a famous Italian high-speed express train that linked Milano Centrale in Milan with Roma Termini station in Rome, via Bologna and Florence.  Introduced in 1953, it was operated by the Italian State Railways (FS) and used the distinctive ETR 300-type electric multiple unit trainsets, featuring observation lounges at the front and rear of the train. When introduced, it "set a standard of speed and luxurious travelling accommodation previously unknown in Italy [and] rivalling anything else on European rails." It was a Trans Europ Express (TEE) from 1974 until its withdrawal, in 1984.

History
Introduced in 1953, the Settebello (Italian: Il Settebello) provided high-speed luxury train service between Milan and Rome. Its name translates as "the beautiful seven" (or alternatively and more loosely as "the lucky seven") and was based on a popular Italian card game known as Scopone, in which the seven-of-diamonds card carries the highest value. A drawing of nine playing cards, with the seven-of-diamonds card shown larger than all of the others, was painted on the side of the train next to its name.

For its entire history Il Settebello was operated by electric multiple-unit trainsets of type ETR 300, and these sets consequently came to be known as "Settebello" type, as they were used exclusively on the Settebello during its period of operation.  These trainsets featured rounded ends with passenger observation lounges, allowing passengers to sit at the very front and rear of the train. The operator's cab – or "command cabin" – was in a raised area behind and above the lounge compartment. The design made the train distinct from all other trains in Italy and all other high-speed trains of the time.  Reservations were required for travel on the Settebello, but the seating in the observation areas was unreserved, allowing any passenger on the train to use it.

The Settebello was originally a Rapido-class service of FS, and from the start it carried first-class coaches only.  The seven-car train included a full restaurant car, operated by the Wagons-Lits Company.  All cars were air-conditioned. In addition to the regular first-class ticket price, the cost of travelling on the luxury train Settebello carried an extra surcharge, or fare supplement. The surcharge alone was almost as much as the first-class fare, but afforded passengers a service "comparable to that of a five-star hotel", with amenities found on very few other day-journey trains of the time.  These included an office where a traveller could "make a telephone call to anywhere in Italy" and the availability of shower facilities in the restrooms.

The train became a Trans Europ Express (TEE) service on 26 May 1974.  It was TEE number 69 southbound and 68 northbound, and in both directions it was the morning TEE serving the Milan–Rome route, which had three TEE trains per day in each direction. During its pre-TEE years, the Settebello had been an evening or midday service, departing Milan at 5:45 p.m. and Rome around 10:30 a.m., and the Milan–Rome trips at those times of day were taken over by a different TEE, the Ambrosiano, upon the Settebellos designation as a TEE.

Scenery along the route included mountain views on the ascent to the  Apennine Tunnel, on the Bologna–Florence section.  On 3 June 1984, the Settebello was renamed Colosseum, which did not use the class-ETR 300 trainsets.

Speed and travel time

The full journey between Milan and Rome took a little more than six hours in 1963.  By 1974, when the train became a Trans-Europe Express, the trip was scheduled to take only 5 hours, 45 minutes, in both directions, and by 1977 the travel time had been reduced by another 10 minutes.

The portion of the route with the fastest average speed was the Milano–Bologna section, averaging .

See also
 History of rail transport in Italy
 List of named passenger trains of Europe

References

External links

Named passenger trains of Italy
Trans Europ Express
Railway services introduced in 1953
Railway services discontinued in 1984
1953 establishments in Italy
1984 disestablishments in Italy